Sandbelt Bowls Region, affiliated with Bowls Victoria is home to 40 lawn bowls clubs in the South and South Eastern Region of Melbourne, Victoria.

Structure

Sandbelt Bowls Region is governed by a Board of Directors, including a president, deputy president, secretary, Bowls Victoria region representatives and 2 ordinary directors.

In addition to the board, a number of sub-committees provide support to the board:
Championship
Laws & Umpiring
Selection
Pennant
Coaching
Greens

The organisation coverage across the Sandbelt Region includes the following bowls clubs:

Albert Park
Armadale
Beaumaris
Bentleigh
Black Rock
Brighton
Brighton Beach
Burden Park
Caulfield Park Alma
Chadstone
Chelsea
Cheltenham
Clayton
Coatesville
Cranbourne
Dandenong Club
Dandenong RSL Recreation
Edithvale
Elsternwick Club
Elsternwick Park
Glen-Eira McKinnon
Hampton
Hampton RSL
Highett
Keysborough
Malvern
Melbourne
Mentone
Moorabbin
Mordialloc
Murrumbeena
Murrumbeena Park
Noble Park
Oakleigh
Parkdale
Sandringham
South Oakleigh (SOC)
South Oakleigh
StKilda
Toorak
Willow Lodge

Former clubs:
Dandenong City (folded 2016)
Alma Sports (folded 2015, members transferred to Caulfield Park)

References

External links
 

Bowls in Australia